In Inuit religion, Kigatilik is a fanged demon that kills angakkuit (shamans).

In media
The game Champions Online has a Cosmic-level boss called Kigatilik, who is a demon god also known as the Slayer of Shaman.

References 

Native American demons
Inuit mythology
Inuit legendary creatures